The Argyle Township Court House & Gaol is a provincially and federally recognised heritage building along Route 308 in the present-day community of Tusket, Nova Scotia. Predating Canadian Confederation, it played a significant role in the administrative, judicial, and political spheres of life in the Municipality of the District of Argyle during the 19th and early 20th centuries. Also known as the Tusket Court House, the building is held to be "the oldest surviving combined court house and jail in Canada." No longer an active court house, the local landmark now serves as a museum and tourist destination.

History 

Construction of the court house was initiated in 1801, taking place over a period of nearly five years, and ending in 1805 with the first sitting of the Court of the General Sessions of the Peace being held on 29 October.

The trial of Omar Pasha Roberts 

During a Supreme Court sitting at Tusket in 1922, presided over by Sir J.A. Chisholm, Omar Pasha Roberts was found guilty of the murder of Miss Flora Gray of Kemptville, Nova Scotia, and subsequently sentenced to hang for the crime.

Museum & Archives 

In 1983, the Argyle Township Court House Archives were formed, becoming the "first Municipal archives in Nova Scotia."

References

Further reading 

MacNutt, James W. Building for Justice: The Historic Courthouses of the Maritimes. HM Scott Smith, 2015

External links 
Argyle Township Court House & Archives

Courthouses in Canada
Buildings and structures in Yarmouth County
National Historic Sites in Nova Scotia